Exocentrus is a genus of longhorn beetles of the subfamily Lamiinae.

Species
 Exocentrus adspersus Mulsant, 1846
 Exocentrus lusitanus (Linnaeus, 1767)
 Exocentrus punctipennis Mulsant et Guillebeau, 1856
 Exocentrus ritae Sama, 1985

References

Acanthocinini